Logan County Airport  is five miles east of Logan, in Logan County, West Virginia. It is owned by the Logan County Airport Authority.

Facilities
In the year ending February 17, 2000 the airport had 2,425 aircraft operations, 99% general aviation and 1% military.

References

External links 
 Logan County Airport at West Virginia Airport Directory
 

Airports in West Virginia
Buildings and structures in Logan County, West Virginia
Transportation in Logan County, West Virginia